Hyang (Kawi, Sundanese, Javanese, and Balinese) is a representation of the supreme being, in ancient Java and Bali mythology. The spiritual entity can be either considered as divine or ancestral. The reverence for this spiritual entity can be found in the folk religions of Java and Bali, such as the Sunda Wiwitan ( Sundanism or Cigugur Sundanism), Kejawen ( non-monotheistic Javanism), Kapitayan ( monotheistic Javanism), and Gama Tirta ( Balinism). The realm where Hyang resides is called the Kahyangan, which is an Old Javanese term that literally means "the abode of Hyang", "part of Hyang", or "heaven".

The Old Sundanese manuscript Sanghyang Siksa Kandang Karesian,have stated that Hyang can be interpreted as "Omnipotence". Similarly, in the highest Sunda Wiwitan Spirituality, Hyang is also referred to as Sang Hyang Kersa (the Powerful).

Gama Tirta  Balinism describes Hyang as a venerated spiritual existence that deserves special reverence. Hyang is commonly described as a sacred and luminous personal form. It is also referred as the name for a spiritual existence that has supernatural powers, portrayed like the sun in a dream and often mentioned in a masculine-form. A Hyang's arrival in a person's life is reputed to give great contentment and happiness to the person. Indonesians generally recognize this term to refer the cause of beauty, the cause of all existence (creator), or simply to refer to God.

In Kejawen  Javanism, the concept of the monotheistic God is described as the Sang Hyang Tunggal or Sang Hyang Wenang. Raden Ngabehi Ranggawarsita in his book, Paramayoga, detailed the names and designations for Javanese concept of God as the objective of worship, including Sang Hyang Suksma Kawekas, Sang Hyang Suksmesa, Sang Hyang Amurbeng Rat, Sang Hyang Sidhem Permanem, Sang Hyang Maha Luhur, Sang Hyang Wisesaning Tunggal, Sang Hyang Wenanging Jagad, Sang Hyang Maha Tinggi, Sang Hyang Manon, Sang Hyang Maha Sidhi, Sang Hyang Warmana, Sang Hyang Atmaweda, etc.

Etymology 

The term Hyang is Old Javanese in origin. It literally means "god", "goddess", "deified being", or "divinity". In Old Sundanese, the term "nga-hyang" means "disappear" or "unseen". In its development, the term "hyang" become the root word for many terms that still known and used in modern Indonesian:

 Reverence. If the word "hyang" is attached with prefixes attribute Sang-, Dang-, Ra-; to form the word Sanghyang, Danghyang, or Rahyang, the word itself is used to honor or revere gods or the deceased ancestors. For example, Sanghyang Sri Pohaci and Sang Hyang Widhi refer to gods, while the stylized name Rahyang Dewa Niskala refer to the name of late king of Sunda kingdom. The term Danghyang, Dhanyang, or Danyang conversely is used to refer to the guardian spirits of certain sacred or haunted places. The name of Srivijayan empire founder, Dapunta Hyang Sri Jayanasa, also contained the name "hyang" which suggested that he possessed supernatural power.
 Place. Kahyangan — later kayangan, from the prefix-suffix conjugation ka-hyang-an — refers to the realm "where hyangs reside". Because of the belief that hyang prefer high places, some mountainous regions is considered as the abode of hyang. For example, Parahyangan refer to mountainous region of West Java. Originated from a conjugated word para-hyang-an; para indicates plural, while the suffix -an shows the place, so Parahyangan can be interpreted as the abode of hyangs. The term kahyangan is also used to refer a type of Pura or Balinese temple. For example, Pura kahyangan jagad is Balinese temple that located in mountainous region as the counterparts of pura segara; Balinese temple located by the sea. Dieng Plateau in  Central Java also shared the same origin, it is from the conjugation di-hyang which also means "hyang's place".
 Activity. The word sembahyang in Indonesian is synonymous with the Islamic salat ritual. It actually originated from the compound word sembah-hyang which means "worship the hyang". One of the instances of sembahyang is the Balinese Sanghyang Dedari, a sacred dance which involves pre-pubescent girls performing complex dances in a trance state. Through complex rituals to summon the spirits, it is believed that the spirits possessed the girls and manifest in their dance. Another example of the ritual is the Sanghyang Jaran , a Balinese version for the Kuda Lumping dance ritual that also involves a form of spirit possession.

In Old Javanese the term Hyang is literally means "god", "goddess", "deified being", or "divinity".

Origin 
The term hyang, now widely associated with Sunda Wiwitan, Kejawen, and Balinism, had developed in ancient Java and Bali more than a millennium ago. This term has its roots in the traditional animism and dynamism in the beliefs of indigenous Indonesians native to the Indonesian archipelago. Native pre-Hindu, pre-Buddhist, and pre-Islamic Indonesians have venerated and revered ancestral spirits. They also have believed that some spirits may inhabit certain places such as large trees, stones, forests, mountains, or sacred places. The hyang concept had indigenously developed in the Indonesian archipelago and is not considered to have originated from Indian dharmic religions.

Before the adoption of Hinduism, Buddhism, and Islam, the natives of the Indonesian archipelago believed in powerful but unseen spiritual entities that could be both benevolent or malevolent. They also believed that the deceased ancestor is not gone away or disappeared completely. The ancestral spirit may gain god-like spiritual power and remain involved in their offsprings’ worldly affairs. That is why the veneration and reverence to honor ancestors is an important element in the belief system of native ethnic groups, such as Nias, Dayak, Toraja, and Papuan ethnic groups, as well as many ethnic groups in Indonesia.

In ancient Sundanese, Javanese, and Balinese society, this unseen spiritual entity is identified as "hyang". These ancestral divine spirits are believed to inhabit high places, such as mountains, hills, and volcanoes. These mountainous regions are considered sacred realms, as the abode of gods and the resting place for the soul of the ancestors.

Several ancient Indonesian inscriptions dated from the Hindu-Buddhist period (8th to 15th century) mentioned Hyang either as the name of sanctuary or the name of deity revered in multiple temples.

Characteristics 
"Hyangs" are said to only move in straight lines. Accordingly, traditional Balinese buildings have a wall called an  just inside the doorway, which keeps the spirits out because they only move in straight lines, and hence bounce off. Similar walls can be seen at the entrance of some Javanese cemeteries. Parallel beliefs are found in other spiritual traditions, as in British corpse roads.

Hyang in native Indonesians' religions 
The concept of hyang can be situated in native Indonesian religions in several ways:

 Balinism: It is Sang Hyang Widhi, the almighty God, the source of goodness brought by the Gods. Identified with Almighty Lord Paramasiwa.
 Javanese Buddhism: It is Sanghyang Adi Buddha, the law of nature that continues to exist, a so-called God that cannot be forgotten, where his Dharma was discovered by Gautama Buddha.
 Islam Nusantara: according to the teachings of Sunan Kalijaga (Tuban Javanese missionary man), the Sang Hyang is the archipelagic ancestor of Sang Hyang Adam, Sang Hyang Sita (prophet Seth), Sang Hyang Wanuh (prophet Noah), Sang Hyang Jawith (Japheth, son of Noah), Sang Hyang Jawana (believed as progenitor of the Javanese), Sang Hyang Jawata (another progenitor of the Javanese), Sang Hyang Bathara Guru, Sang Hyang Ismaya, Sang Hyang Bathara Wisnu, and so on, until the deceased parents are personified as the spiritual entity united with Sang Hyang.

See also

 Balinism
 Indonesian Esoteric Buddhism
 Hinduism in Java
 Javanism
 Kaharingan
 Sunda Wiwitan
 Aitu
 Anito
 Atua
 Kami, similar concept in Japanese Shinto faith
 Kupua
 Shen, similar concept in Chinese folk religion
 Taotao Mona

References 

 Bali Religion

Animism in Asia
Balinese mythology
Indonesian deities
Javanese mythology
Sundanese mythology